Peterborough This Week is a weekly non subscription-distribution newspaper in Peterborough, Ontario. It was established in 1989. It is one of three newspapers in the Kawartha Division of Metroland Media, a company that owns newspapers across Ontario. Its content is updated via a website which also carries video, blogs, polls and news from its sister papers from the Kawartha Region. Its staff also produce niche magazines and a variety of online services and provides digital media solutions.

Peterborough This Week has a circulation reaching 48,000 homes and employs 150 people. The current publisher is Dana Robbins, the general manager is Mary Babcock, and the editor-in-chief is Marcus Tully.

Past editors
Wendy Gallagher 1994-2002
 Paul Rellinger (2002–2005)
 Lois Tuffin (2005–2018)

Past sales managers
 Chuck McLaren (1989–1992)
 Jennifer Bronsma (1992–1995)
 Gavin Beer (1995–2001)
 Adam Milligan (2002-2015)
 Shane Lockyer (2010-2014)

Past publishers

 Greg Walsh (1989–1990)
 Andy Cook (1990–1993)
 Hugh Nicholson (1993-2001)
 Bruce Danford (2002–2014)
 Mike Mount (2014-2016)
 Peter Bishop (2016-2019)

Facts and trivia
 Peterborough This Week published its first 3D issue on Wednesday, March 31, 2011, thanks in part to local business Kawartha Chrysler Jeep Dodge and their ad campaign.

See also
List of newspapers in Canada

Biweekly newspapers published in Canada
Newspapers published in Peterborough, Ontario
Torstar publications
Newspapers established in 1989
1989 establishments in Ontario